Guillermo Fernández Romo (born 23 November 1978) is a Spanish football manager.

Career
Born in Madrid, Fernández Romo started his career working as a football teacher at EF Aluche in 1997. He then became a youth coach at SR Villaverde Boetticher CF in the following year, and subsequently worked at several youth sides before having his first senior experience at the helm of CD Racing Garvin in the regional leagues.

In 2005, after working as a scout at UD Vecindario, Fernández Romo was named manager of Tercera División side CD Las Rozas. He later returned to youth sides, notably managing the Juvenil sides of Pontevedra CF (being also an assistant of the reserves for a brief period) and RC Celta de Vigo before being appointed in charge of SD Noja in 2010.

In 2011, Fernández Romo joined Óscar Cano's staff at UD Melilla as his assistant. He left the side after Cano's departure in June 2012, being later named manager of Villalonga FC; in December 2012, he opted to leave the latter side to rejoin Cano's staff at Real Betis B, and was also with the manager at CD Alcoyano.

Fernández Romo returned to managerial duties in July 2015, at the helm of Segunda División B side CD Olímpic de Xàtiva. Sacked on 7 February 2016, he became the technical secretary of Real Murcia on 8 June.

On 26 January 2017, Fernández Romo was presented as manager of CE Sabadell FC also in the third division. He left in June, and joined FC Jumilla in July as a sporting director. He became the latter's manager in April 2018, and managed to avoid relegation by four of the five remaining matches of the season.

On 22 May 2018, Fernández Romo was hired by Racing de Santander to become the club's youth coordinator, but moved to SD Ejea on 13 August after being named manager of the side. He opted to leave on 10 June 2019, after being named in charge of UE Cornellà.

On 19 May 2021, Fernández Romo left Cornellà and immediately returned to Racing, now being named first team manager in the Primera División RFEF. He led the latter club to a Segunda División return after a two-year absence in his first season, with four matches to go.

On 12 December 2022, following a run of five defeats in a row, Fernández Romo was sacked by Racing.

Managerial statistics

References

External links

1978 births
Living people
Sportspeople from Madrid
Spanish football managers
Primera Federación managers
Segunda División B managers
Tercera División managers
CE Sabadell FC managers
FC Jumilla managers
UE Cornellà managers
Racing de Santander managers
21st-century Spanish people